is a Japanese comedian, singer and actor.  He is best known as a member of Tunnels and Yaen with his partner  Noritake Kinashi.

Early life and family 
Born in Katsushika, Tokyo, Japan, Ishibashi moved to Narimasu, Itabashi after his father's bankruptcy in his first grade at an elementary school.  He attended  Teikyo Junior & Senior High School. In November 1998, Ishibashi married actress . The couple later had three daughters. In July 2021, the couple announced they were divorcing. He has several nicknames such as "Taka-san" and "Taka-chan."

Career 
Ishibashi is known for "teasing" music artists on his show Utaban alongside co-host Masahiro Nakai, especially Morning Musume. This is apparently done purely for humor, based on comments made regarding Takaaki by his "victims," and in many cases these taunts actually increase the marketing "buzz" surrounding the artists.

Particularly well known is Ishibashi's fascination with accusing  of anything from simple hideousness, to outright alien or supernatural evil, which started back when the group debuted. Numerous CG images will depict her as a hag or Kappa or show her in some maniacal facial expression while doing the activities she is speaking of in the interview. Both Kei and her mother apparently credit this humorous "abuse" with Kei's popularity as a member.

Ishibashi was also criticised in 2017 when he revived a 30-year-old character that played on homophobic stereotypes.

He is also an actor known for playing Isuro Tanaka in the film Major League II and Taka Tanaka in Major League: Back to the Minors.

Ishibashi is a member of the Japanese vocal group Yazima Beauty Salon.

References

External links
 

1961 births
Japanese male film actors
Japanese impressionists (entertainers)
Living people